Margaret Mayo, born Lillian Elizabeth Slatten, was an American actress, playwright, and screenwriter.

Early life 
She was raised on a farm near Brownsville, Illinois. Later, she was educated at the Girl’s College in Fox Lake, Wisconsin; the Convent of the Sacred Heart in Salem, Oregon; and at Stanford University. In her teen years, she traveled to New York City to pursue an acting career.

She worked as many things: adapter, actress, film company founding partner, playwright, and a writer. In 1901, she married Edgar Selwyn, a fellow actor. Until about 1917, Mayo averaged about a play per year.

Biography 
When she moved to New York City in her early teens, she won a small part in a play named Thoroughbred at the Garrick Theatre. She met her husband, Edgar Selwyn, in 1896. The same year, she began her writing career. Her earliest successes were adaptations of novels: The Marriage of William Ashe (1905) and The Jungle (1907).

However, Mayo is best remembered as the author of more original plays such as Polly of the Circus (1907), Baby Mine (1910), Twin Beds (1914), and Seeing Things (1920), written with Aubrey Kennedy. She adapted several of her plays for the silent screen. Her play Polly of the Circus became the first film produced in 1917 by the Goldwyn Company, of which she was a founding member.

Career 
One of her most famous plays was called Baby Mine. Her other works include Commencement Days, Crippled Hearts, and Twin Beds. Her work utilized parody and satire to talk about social issues. In 1917, Mayo became head of the scenario department of Goldwyn Pictures. After a year, she left to go overseas and entertain the troops.

In 1919, Mayo and Selwyn got divorced. Afterward, Mayo changed her name to Elizabeth Mayo and moved to New York to live with her mother. In 1926, she signed the Agreement of American Dramatists, a document that led to the foundation of the Dramatists Guild. She also began selling real estate.

As she got older, she began to write about the spiritual world. Mayo was instrumental in making housing arrangements for Indian spiritual teacher Meher Baba at Harmon, near New York City, during his first visit to America in 1931. She owned and provided the stone house retreat where he stayed on this trip.

Death 
Margaret Mayo died on February 25, 1951, in the Ossining Hospital just north of Sing Sing Prison. She was attended by a nurse from the Dominican Sisters of the Sick Poor also in Ossining, New York. The American actress and playwright and screenwriter is buried in St. Francis of Assisi Cemetery in Mount Kisco, New York.

References

External links 
 
 
 
 
 Margaret Mayo at the Women Film Pioneers Project
 Margaret Mayo papers, 1882–1970 (bulk 1901–1950), held by the Billy Rose Theatre Division, New York Public Library for the Performing Arts
 two photos of Margaret Mayo, ..photo #1, ...photo #2

1882 births
1951 deaths
American stage actresses
19th-century American actresses
American women screenwriters
20th-century American actresses
American women dramatists and playwrights
20th-century American dramatists and playwrights
20th-century American women writers
People from White County, Illinois
Actresses from Illinois
Women film pioneers
Screenwriters from Illinois
20th-century American screenwriters